Marko Radić ((born 1 October 1985 in Belgrade) is a Serbian football defender who currently plays Slovak amateur side TJ Spartak Kvašov.

External links
MFK Ružomberok profile

References

1985 births
Living people
Footballers from Belgrade
Serbian footballers
Serbian expatriate footballers
Association football defenders
MŠK Púchov players
Slovak Super Liga players
MFK Ružomberok players
FK Čadca players
Wisła Płock players
SFC Opava players
Czech National Football League players
Czech First League players
I liga players
Expatriate footballers in Slovakia
Expatriate footballers in Poland
Expatriate footballers in the Czech Republic
Serbian expatriate sportspeople in Slovakia
Serbian expatriate sportspeople in Poland
Serbian expatriate sportspeople in the Czech Republic